Edward Holcomb Plumb (June 6, 1907, Streator, Illinois – April 18, 1958, Los Angeles, California) was a film composer and orchestrator best known for his work at Walt Disney Studios. He served as musical director of Fantasia and orchestrated and co-composed the score for Bambi, and orchestrated and expanded the film's Main composer Frank Churchill's menacing but simple three-note theme.

Life and career 
Plumb was born in Streator, Illinois. His grandfather, Colonel Ralph Plumb founded the city of Streator in 1866. In the 1930s, Plumb moved to California and began work as a composer and orchestrator in the film industry. In addition to his work for Disney, Plumb frequently worked on titles for other studios, including Republic, Paramount and 20th Century Fox. In 1953, he wrote the music for MGM's Tom and Jerry short called The Missing Mouse because Scott Bradley was on vacation. Back at Disney, Plumb orchestrated the music for the Whale Chase sequence in Pinocchio, Dumbo, Make Mine Music, Song of the South, Beanero in Fun and Fancy Free, So Dear to My Heart, some subsidiary cues for Cinderella,  Peter Pan, and Lady and the Tramp. He also orchestrated a number of television programs for Walt Disney Presents, a number of Davy Crockett films and on Westward Ho, the Wagons!, starring Fess Parker. His final film project was Johnny Tremain for Disney in 1957.

Plumb died from long-term effects of alcohol consumption on April 18, 1958. He was 50.

He received Oscar nominations for Bambi, Victory Through Air Power, Saludos Amigos and The Three Caballeros.

In the Tom and Jerry cartoon "The Missing Mouse" he is credited as "Edward Plumb" without the H. initial.

Disney credits 

 1940 Pinocchio - additional music - uncredited
 1940 Fantasia - musical director
 1941 The Reluctant Dragon - orchestration - uncredited
 1941 Dumbo - orchestrator
 1942 Bambi - orchestrator/co-composer
 1942 Saludos Amigos - score
 1943 Victory Through Air Power - score
 1944 The Three Caballeros - associate music director
 1945 Donald's Crime - score
 1946 Make Mine Music - associate music director
 1946 Song of the South - orchestration
 1947 Fun and Fancy Free - orchestration - uncredited
 1949 So Dear to My Heart - orchestration as Ed Plumb
 1950 Cinderella - orchestration - uncredited
 1950 In Beaver Valley - orchestration - uncredited
 1951 Nature's Half Acre - orchestration - uncredited
 1952 The Olympic Elk - orchestration - uncredited
 1952 Water Birds - orchestration
 1953 Peter Pan - orchestration
 1953 Bear Country - orchestration - uncredited
 1953 The Alaskan Eskimo - orchestration - uncredited
 1953 The New Neighbor - score
 1953 The Living Desert - orchestration
 1953 How to Sleep - score
 1954 Donald's Diary - score
 1954 The Vanishing Prairie - orchestration
 1955 Davy Crockett: King of the Wild Frontier - orchestration
 1955 Lady and the Tramp - orchestration
 1956 Davy Crockett and the River Pirates - orchestration
 1956 Secrets of Life - orchestration
 1956 Westward Ho the Wagons! - orchestration
 1957 Johnny Tremain - orchestration

Works outside of the Disney Studio 

 1942 Iceland - orchestrator
 1942 Careful, Soft Shoulders - orchestrator
 1942 Girl Trouble - orchestrator
 1942 You Were Never Lovelier - orchestrator
 1944 Ever Since Venus
 1945 The Phantom Speaks - score
 1945 The Woman Who Came Back - score
 1945 Doll Face - orchestrator
 1946 Murder in the Music Hall - additional music - uncredited
 1946 Valley of the Zombies
 1946 Centennial Summer
 1946 Monsieur Beaucaire
 1947 Calcutta - orchestrator
 1947 Variety Girl - composer "Puppetoon" sequence
 1948 The Sainted Sisters - orchestrator
 1949 The Accused - orchestrator
 1949 The Great Lover - orchestrator
 1950 The Happy Years - orchestrator
 1950 Fancy Pants - orchestrator
 1951 Quebec
 1951 The Painted Hills - orchestrator
 1951 That's My Boy - orchestrator
 1951 Angels in the Outfield - orchestrator
 1953 The Missing Mouse

References 
Notes

The library of Congress

Film Composers in America 1911 - 1970 by Clifford McCarthy

Bibliography
 
 Care, Ross B. (January 1983) "Threads of Care: The Evolution of a Major Film Score - Walt Disney's Bambi," The Quarterly Journal of the Library of Congress v. 40, n. 2, p. 100
 Tietyan, Dave (1990) The Musical World of Walt Disney. New York: Harry N. Abrams.

External links 

 

1907 births
1958 deaths
American film score composers
Animation composers
People from Streator, Illinois
Walt Disney Animation Studios people
20th-century classical musicians
20th-century American composers
Metro-Goldwyn-Mayer cartoon studio people
Alcohol-related deaths in California